Bamorta Union is an Union Parishad under Bagerhat Sadar Upazila of Bagerhat District in the division of Khulna, Bangladesh. It has an area of 99.87 km2 (38.56 sq mi) and a population of 32,620.

Villages 
 Condola
 Sultanpur
 Bemorta
 Rajapur
 Ramachandrapur
 Bijaypur
 Joygasi
 Raghunathpur
 Khalkulia

 Ramnagar Satagachia
 Chargram
 Bhadrapara
 Baitpur
 Chitli
 Fatepur
 Kalabaria
 Arjunbahar
 Dhanagati
 Anardanga
 Kapalibandor
 Moujardanga

 Kharasambol
 Bergajalia
 Dattakathi
 Bishnupur

References

Unions of Bagerhat Sadar Upazila
Unions of Bagerhat District
Unions of Khulna Division